Retrospective Exhibition "Painting of 1940–1990s. The Leningrad School" (Russian: Живопись 1940-1990 годов. Ленинградская школа (выставка, 1996)) was one of the most notable events in the Saint Petersburg exhibition live of 1996. The exhibition took place at the Memorial Museum of Nikolai A. Nekrasov.

History and Organization 
The exhibition opened on March 2, and ran until 3 April, 1997. A catalog was published for the exhibition.

Contributing Artists 
The exhibition included 93 artworks from 50 painters of the Leningrad School:

Contributed Artworks 
For the Exhibition were selected art works created in 1950-1980s. Some of them had been exhibited before, while other paintings were shown for the first time.

Genre painting was represented by the works of "Ica Cream Vender" by Veniamin Borisov, "At the Summer Bath house" by Maya Kopitseva, "Spring in the City" by Piotr Litvinsky, "Gas pipeline laying" and "Asphalt laying works" by Anatoli Nenartovich, "Spring Day" by Nikolai Pozdneev, "Station Baikal. At the pier" by Anatoli Vasiliev, and some others.

Portrait painting was represented by the works of "Junior Sergeant" by Vladimir Chekalov, "Schoolgirl" by Tatiana Gorb, "In summer at reading" by Nikolai Pozdneev, "In the Sun" by Alexander Samokhvalov, "Old Man" by Leonid Tkachenko, and some others.

Landscape and Cityscape painting was represented by the works of "Windy Day" by Irina Baldina, "Winter Tale" and "Arabian coast" by Vsevolod Bazhenov, "Be a full wind" and "Near Kostroma City" by Evgeny Chuprun, "On the Volga River" and "Somewhere in Karelia" by Nikolai Galakhov, "Autumn Road" by Mikhail Kozell, "Izborsk Fortress" by Sergei Osipov, "Wave. Caspian Sea" and "Old Ladoga" by Vladimir Ovchinnikov, "Little street" by Nikolai Timkov, "Silhouettes Gurzuf" by Ruben Zakharian, and some others.

Still life painting was represented by the works of "Roses" by Samuil Nevelshtein, "Still life with Pussy-Willows" by Taisia Afonina, "Still life with yellow material" by Rostislav Vovkushevsky, "A Lilac" by Kapitolina Rumiantseva, and some others.

Reception 
The exhibition was widely covered in the press and in literature specialized in Soviet fine art.

See also 

 Fine Art of Leningrad
 Leningrad School of Painting
 Saint Petersburg Union of Artists
 Socialist realism

References

Further reading 
 Справочник членов Ленинградской организации Союза художников РСФСР. Л., Художник РСФСР, 1987.
 Художники народов СССР. Биобиблиографический словарь. Т/1-4. М., Искусство, 1970-1995.
 Справочник членов Союза художников СССР. Том 1,2. М., Советский художник, 1979.
 Time for Change. The Art of 1960-1985 in the Soviet Union. Saint Petersburg, State Russian Museum, 2006. 
 Юбилейный справочник выпускников Санкт-Петербургского академического института живописи, скульптуры и архитектуры имени И. Е. Репина Российской Академии художеств. 1915—2005. СПб., Первоцвет, 2007.

Art exhibitions in Russia
1996 works
1996 in Russia
Socialist realism
Culture in Saint Petersburg